This is a list of world champions in men's water polo since the inaugural official edition in 1973.

Abbreviations

History
The 1973 Men's World Water Polo Championship was the first edition of the men's water polo tournament at the World Aquatics Championships, organized by the world governing body in aquatics, the FINA.

As of 2022, men's water polo teams from eight European countries won all 19 tournaments.

Italy is the most successful country in men's water polo tournament at the World Aquatics Championships, with four gold medals.

Hungary and Spain has won three titles in men's water polo tournament.

The Spain men's national team is current world champion.

Legend

  – Debut
  – Champion
  – Winning streak (winning three or more world championships in a row)
  – Hosts
 † – Defunct team

Team statistics

Results

Olympic and world champions (teams)

Player statistics

Age records
The following tables show the oldest and youngest male world champions in water polo.

Legend
  – Host team

Multiple gold medalists
The following tables are pre-sorted by date of receiving the last gold medal (in ascending order), date of receiving the first gold medal (in ascending order), name of the player (in ascending order), respectively.

There is only one male athlete who won three gold medals in water polo at the World Aquatics Championships.

Legend
 * – Host team

There are twenty-eight male athletes who won two gold medals in water polo at the World Aquatics Championships.

Legend
 * – Host team

Olympic and world champions (players)

World champion families
The following tables are pre-sorted by date of receiving the gold medal (in ascending order), name of the player (in ascending order), respectively.

Legend
 * – Host team

Coach statistics

Most successful coaches

The following table is pre-sorted by number of gold medals (in descending order), date of winning the last gold medal (in ascending order), name of the coach (in ascending order), respectively.

There are three coaches who led men's national water polo teams to win two or more gold medals at the World Aquatics Championships.

Ratko Rudić led three men's national water polo teams to win gold medals at the World Aquatics Championships. He guided Yugoslavia men's national team to a gold medal in 1986, Italy men's national team to a gold medal in 1994, and Croatia men's national team to a gold medal in 2007, making him the first and only coach to lead three different men's national water polo teams to the world titles.

Spaniard Juan Jané coached the Spain men's national team to two consecutive gold medals at the World Aquatics Championships in 1998 and 2001.

Alessandro Campagna is another coach who led men's national water polo team(s) to win two gold medals. Under his leadership, the Italy men's national team won two world titles in 2011 and 2019.

Legend
 * – Host team

Champions as coach and player

The following table is pre-sorted by number of gold medals (in descending order), date of winning the last gold medal (in ascending order), name of the person (in ascending order), respectively.

Three water polo players won gold medals at the World Aquatics Championships and then guided men's national water polo teams to the world titles as head coaches.

Tibor Benedek of Hungary won a gold medal at the 2003 World Aquatics Championships. Ten years later, he coached the Hungary men's national team to the world title in 2013.

Italian Alessandro Campagna won a gold medal at the 1994 World Aquatics Championships in Rome, coached by Ratko Rudić. As a head coach, he led Italy men's national team to win two gold in 2011 and 2019.

Dejan Savić, representing Serbia and Montenegro, won a gold medal in 2005. He then guided Serbia men's national team to the world title in 2015.

Legend
 * – Host team

Olympic and world champions (coaches)

Champions by tournament

2019 (Italy, 4th title)
 Edition of men's tournament: 18th
 Host city:  Gwangju, South Korea
 Number of participating teams: 16
 Competition format: Round-robin pools advanced teams to classification matches
 Champion:  (4th title; 1st place in preliminary D group)

Source: Official Results Books (PDF): 2019 (Men's Competition Schedule, Men's Round Summary).

 Head coach:  Alessandro Campagna (2nd title as head coach)
 Assistant coaches:  Amedeo Pomilio,  Alessandro Duspiva

Sources:
 Official Results Books (PDF): 2019 (Team Roster – Italy);
 ISHOF: "Honorees by Country".

Abbreviation

 MP – Matches played
 Min – Minutes
 G – Goals
 Sh – Shots
 TF – Turnover fouls
 ST – Steals
 RB – Rebounds
 BL – Blocked shots
 SP – Sprints
 20S – 20 seconds exclusion
 DE – Double exclusion
 Pen – Penalty
 EX – Exclusion

Source: Official Results Books (PDF): 2019 (Cumulative Statistics – Italy, p. 3).

2017 (Croatia, 2nd title)
 Edition of men's tournament: 17th
 Host city:  Budapest, Hungary
 Number of participating teams: 16
 Competition format: Round-robin pools advanced teams to classification matches
 Champion:  (2nd title; 1st place in preliminary D group)

Source: Official Results Books (PDF): 2017 (Men's Competition Schedule, Men's Round Summary).

 Head coach:  Ivica Tucak (1st title as head coach)
 Assistant coaches:  Mile Smodlaka,  Pero Kuterovac

Sources:
 Official Results Books (PDF): 2017 (Team Roster – Croatia);
 ISHOF: "Honorees by Country".

Abbreviation

 MP – Matches played
 Min – Minutes
 G – Goals
 Sh – Shots
 AS – Rebounds
 TF – Turnover fouls
 ST – Steals
 BL – Blocked shots
 SP – Sprints
 20S – 20 seconds exclusion
 DE – Double exclusion
 Pen – Penalty
 EX – Exclusion

Source: Official Results Books (PDF): 2017 (Cumulative Statistics – Croatia, p. 3).

2015 (Serbia, 2nd title)

 Edition of men's tournament: 16th
 Host city:  Kazan, Russia
 Number of participating teams: 16
 Competition format: Round-robin pools advanced teams to classification matches
 Champion:  (2nd title; 1st place in preliminary D group)

Source: Official Results Books (PDF): 2015 (Men's Competition Schedule, Men's Round Summary).

 Head coach:  Dejan Savić (1st title as head coach)
 Assistant coaches:  Zarko Petrovic,  Uros Stevanovic

Note: Duško Pijetlović and Gojko Pijetlović are brothers.
Sources:
 Official Results Books (PDF): 2015 (Team Roster – Serbia);
 ISHOF: "Honorees by Country".

Abbreviation

 MP – Matches played
 Min – Minutes
 G – Goals
 Sh – Shots
 AS – Assists
 TF – Turnover fouls
 ST – Steals
 BL – Blocked shots
 SP – Sprints
 20S – 20 seconds exclusion
 DE – Double exclusion
 Pen – Penalty
 EX – Exclusion

Source: Official Results Books (PDF): 2015 (Cumulative Statistics – Serbia, p. 2).

2013 (Hungary, 3rd title)
 Edition of men's tournament: 15th
 Host city:  Barcelona, Spain
 Number of participating teams: 16
 Competition format: Round-robin pools advanced teams to classification matches
 Champion:  (3rd title;2nd place in preliminary C group)

Source: Official Results Books (PDF): 2013 (Men's Competition Schedule, Men's Round Summary).

 Head coach:  Tibor Benedek (1st title as head coach)
 Assistant coach:  Norbert Dabrowski

Note: Ádám Decker and Attila Decker are brothers; Dániel Varga and Dénes Varga are brothers.
Sources:
 Official Results Books (PDF): 2013 (Team Roster – Hungary);
 ISHOF: "Honorees by Country".

Abbreviation

 MP – Matches played
 Min – Minutes
 G – Goals
 Sh – Shots
 AS – Assists
 TF – Turnover fouls
 ST – Steals
 BL – Blocked shots
 SP – Sprints
 20S – 20 seconds exclusion
 DE – Double exclusion
 Pen – Penalty
 EX – Exclusion

Source: Official Results Books (PDF): 2013 (Cumulative Statistics – Hungary, p. 2).

2011 (Italy, 3rd title)
 Edition of men's tournament: 14th
 Host city:  Shanghai, China
 Number of participating teams: 16
 Competition format: Round-robin pools advanced teams to classification matches
 Champion:  (3rd title; 1st place in preliminary D group)

Source: Official Results Books (PDF): 2011 (Men's Competition Schedule, Men's Round Summary).

 Head coach:  Alessandro Campagna (1st title as head coach)

Sources:
 Official Results Books (PDF): 2011 (Team Roster – Italy);
 ISHOF: "Honorees by Country".

Abbreviation

 MP – Matches played
 Min – Minutes
 G – Goals
 Sh – Shots
 AS – Assists
 TF – Turnover fouls
 ST – Steals
 BL – Blocked shots
 SP – Sprints
 20S – 20 seconds exclusion
 Pen – Penalty
 EX – Exclusion

Source: Official Results Books (PDF): 2011 (Cumulative Statistics – Italy, p. 3).

2009 (Serbia, 1st title)
 Edition of men's tournament: 13th
 Host city:  Rome, Italy
 Number of participating teams: 16
 Competition format: Round-robin pools advanced teams to classification matches
 Champion:  (1st title; 2nd place in preliminary C group)

Source: Official Results Books (PDF): 2009 (Men's Competition Schedule, Men's Round Summary).

 Head coach:  Dejan Udovičić (1st title as head coach)
 Assistant coach:  Dejan Stanojević

Note: Duško Pijetlović and Gojko Pijetlović are brothers.
Sources:
 Official Results Books (PDF): 2009 (Team Roster – Serbia);
 ISHOF: "Honorees by Country".

Abbreviation

 MP – Matches played
 Min – Minutes
 G – Goals
 Sh – Shots
 AS – Assists
 TF – Turnover fouls
 ST – Steals
 BL – Blocked shots
 SP – Sprints
 20S – 20 seconds exclusion
 Pen – Penalty
 EX – Exclusion

Source: Official Results Books (PDF): 2009 (Cumulative Statistics – Serbia, p. 2).

2007 (Croatia, 1st title)
 Edition of men's tournament: 12th
 Host city:  Melbourne, Australia
 Number of participating teams: 16
 Competition format: Round-robin pools advanced teams to classification matches
 Champion:  (1st title; 1st place in preliminary B group)

Source: Official Results Books (PDF): 2007 (Men's Round Summary).

 Head coach:  Ratko Rudić (3rd title as head coach)
 Assistant coaches:  Milorad Damjanić

Sources:
 Official Results Books (PDF): 2007 (Start Lists – Croatia: match 02, match 16, match 19, match 36, match 43, match 48);
 ISHOF: "Honorees by Country".

Abbreviation

 MP – Matches played
 Min – Minutes
 G – Goals
 Sh – Shots
 AS – Assists
 TF – Turnover fouls
 ST – Steals
 BL – Blocked shots
 SP – Sprints
 20S – 20 seconds exclusion
 Pen – Penalty
 EX – Exclusion

Source: Official Results Books (PDF): 2007 (Results – Croatia: match 02, match 16, match 19, match 36, match 43, match 48).

2005 (Serbia and Montenegro, 1st title)
 Edition of men's tournament: 11th
 Host city:  Montreal, Canada
 Number of participating teams: 16
 Competition format: Round-robin pools advanced teams to classification matches
 Champion:  (1st title; 1st place in preliminary B group)

Sources:
 Official Reports (FINA) (PDF): "World Championship" (p. 15);
 Todor66: "2005 World Championship (men's tournament)".

 Head coach:  Petar Porobić (1st title as head coach)
 Assistant coaches:  Mirko Blazedic

Sources:
 Official Reports (FINA) (PDF): "World Champions–Team Line-up" (p. 17);
 Olympedia: "Olympians Who Won a Medal at the World Aquatics Championships";
 ISHOF: "Honorees by Country".

2003 (Hungary, 2nd title)
 Edition of men's tournament: 10th
 Host city:  Barcelona, Spain
 Number of participating teams: 16
 Competition format: Round-robin pools advanced teams to classification matches
 Champion:  (2nd title; 1st place in preliminary A group)

Sources:
 Official Reports (FINA) (PDF): "World Championship" (p. 15);
 Todor66: "2003 World Championship (men's tournament)".

 Head coach:  Dénes Kemény (1st title as head coach)

Sources:
 Official Reports (FINA) (PDF): "World Champions–Team Line-up" (p. 17);
 Olympedia: "Olympians Who Won a Medal at the World Aquatics Championships";
 ISHOF: "Honorees by Country".

2001 (Spain, 2nd title)
 Edition of men's tournament: 9th
 Host city:  Fukuoka, Japan
 Number of participating teams: 16
 Competition format: Round-robin pools advanced teams to the round-robin quarter-final pool; round-robin quarter-final pools advanced teams to classification matches
 Champion:  (2nd title; 1st place in preliminary D group; 1st place in quarter-final F group)

Sources:
 Official Reports (FINA) (PDF): "World Championship" (p. 15);
 Todor66: "2001 World Championship (men's tournament)".

 Head coach:  Juan Jané (2nd title as head coach)

Note: Daniel Moro and Iván Moro are brothers.
Sources:
 Official Reports (FINA) (PDF): "World Champions–Team Line-up" (p. 17);
 Olympedia: "Olympians Who Won a Medal at the World Aquatics Championships";
 ISHOF: "Honorees by Country".

1998 (Spain, 1st title)
 Edition of men's tournament: 8th
 Host city:  Perth, Australia
 Number of participating teams: 16
 Competition format: Round-robin pools advanced teams to the round-robin quarter-final pool; round-robin quarter-final pools advanced teams to classification matches
 Champion:  (1st title; 1st place in preliminary C group; 1st place in quarter-final F group)

Sources:
 Official Reports (FINA) (PDF): "World Championship" (p. 15);
 Todor66: "1998 World Championship (men's tournament)".

 Head coach:  Juan Jané (1st title as head coach)

Sources:
 Official Reports (FINA) (PDF): "World Champions–Team Line-up" (p. 17);
 Olympedia: "Olympians Who Won a Medal at the World Aquatics Championships";
 ISHOF: "Honorees by Country".

1994 (Italy, 2nd title)
 Edition of men's tournament: 7th
 Host city:  Rome, Italy
 Number of participating teams: 16
 Competition format: Round-robin pools advanced teams to the round-robin quarter-final pool; round-robin quarter-final pools advanced teams to classification matches
 Champion:  (2nd title; 1st place in preliminary D group; 1st place in quarter-final F group)

Sources:
 Official Reports (FINA) (PDF): "World Championship" (p. 15);
 Todor66: "1994 World Championship (men's tournament)".

 Head coach:  Ratko Rudić (2nd title as head coach)

Note: Francesco Porzio and Pino Porzio are brothers.
Sources:
 Official Reports (FINA) (PDF): "World Champions–Team Line-up" (p. 17);
 Olympedia: "Olympians Who Won a Medal at the World Aquatics Championships";
 Todor66: "1994 World Championship (men's tournament)";
 ISHOF: "Honorees by Country".

1991 (Yugoslavia, 2nd title)
 Edition of men's tournament: 6th
 Host city:  Perth, Australia
 Number of participating teams: 16
 Competition format: Round-robin pools advanced teams to the round-robin quarter-final pool; round-robin quarter-final pools advanced teams to classification matches
 Champion:  (2nd title; 1st place in preliminary B group; 1st place in quarter-final E group)

Sources:
 Official Reports (FINA) (PDF): "World Championship" (p. 15);
 Todor66: "1991 World Championship (men's tournament)".

 Head coach:  Nikola Stamenić (1st title as head coach)

Sources:
 Official Reports (FINA) (PDF): "World Champions–Team Line-up" (p. 17);
 Olympedia: "Olympians Who Won a Medal at the World Aquatics Championships";
 ISHOF: "Honorees by Country".

1986 (Yugoslavia, 1st title)
 Edition of men's tournament: 5th
 Host city:  Madrid, Spain
 Number of participating teams: 15
 Competition format: Round-robin pools advanced teams to the round-robin quarter-final pool; round-robin quarter-final pools advanced teams to classification matches
 Champion:  (1st title; 1st place in preliminary B group; 1st place in quarter-final E group)

Sources:
 Official Reports (FINA) (PDF): "World Championship" (p. 15);
 Todor66: "1986 World Championship (men's tournament)".

 Head coach:  Ratko Rudić (1st title as head coach)

Sources:
 Official Reports (FINA) (PDF): "World Champions–Team Line-up" (p. 17);
 Olympedia: "Olympians Who Won a Medal at the World Aquatics Championships";
 ISHOF: "Honorees by Country".

1982 (Soviet Union, 2nd title)
 Edition of men's tournament: 4th
 Host city:  Guayaquil, Ecuador
 Number of participating teams: 16
 Competition format: Round-robin pools advanced teams to the round-robin semi-final pool; round-robin semi-final pools advanced teams to the round-robin final pool
 Champion:  (2nd title; 1st place in preliminary B group; 1st place in semi-final E group)

Sources:
 Official Reports (FINA) (PDF): "World Championship" (p. 15);
 Todor66: "1982 World Championship (men's tournament)".

 Head coach:  Boris Popov (1st title as head coach)

Sources:
 Official Reports (FINA) (PDF): "World Champions–Team Line-up" (p. 17);
 Olympedia: "Olympians Who Won a Medal at the World Aquatics Championships";
 ISHOF: "Honorees by Country".

1978 (Italy, 1st title)
 Edition of men's tournament: 3rd
 Host city:  West Berlin, West Germany
 Number of participating teams: 16
 Competition format: Round-robin pools advanced teams to the round-robin semi-final pool; round-robin semi-final pools advanced teams to the round-robin final pool
 Champion:  (1st title; 2nd place in preliminary A group; 1st place in semi-final E group)

Sources:
 Official Reports (FINA) (PDF): "World Championship" (p. 15);
 Todor66: "1978 World Championship (men's tournament)".

 Head coach:  Gianni Lonzi (1st title as head coach)

Sources:
 Official Reports (FINA) (PDF): "World Champions–Team Line-up" (p. 17);
 Olympedia: "Olympians Who Won a Medal at the World Aquatics Championships";
 ISHOF: "Honorees by Country".

1975 (Soviet Union, 1st title)
 Edition of men's tournament: 2nd
 Host city:  Cali, Colombia
 Number of participating teams: 16
 Competition format: Round-robin pools advanced teams to the round-robin semi-final pool; round-robin semi-final pools advanced teams to the round-robin final pool
 Champion:  (1st title; 1st place in preliminary C group; 1st place in semi-final F group)

Sources:
 Official Reports (FINA) (PDF): "World Championship" (p. 15);
 Todor66: "1975 World Championship (men's tournament)".

 Head coach:  Anatoly Blumental

Sources:
 Official Reports (FINA) (PDF): "World Champions–Team Line-up" (p. 17);
 Olympedia: "Olympians Who Won a Medal at the World Aquatics Championships";
 ISHOF: "Honorees by Country".

1973 (Hungary, 1st title)
 Edition of men's tournament: 1st
 Host city:  Belgrade, Yugoslavia
 Number of participating teams: 16
 Competition format: Round-robin pools advanced teams to the round-robin final pool
 Champion:  (1st title; 1st place in preliminary B group)

Sources:
 Official Reports (FINA) (PDF): "World Championship" (p. 15);
 Todor66: "1973 World Championship (men's tournament)".

 Head coach:  Dezső Gyarmati (1st title as head coach)

Sources:
 Official Reports (FINA) (PDF): "World Champions–Team Line-up" (p. 17);
 Olympedia: "Olympians Who Won a Medal at the World Aquatics Championships";
 ISHOF: "Honorees by Country".

See also
 Water polo at the World Aquatics Championships
 List of world champions in women's water polo
 List of World Aquatics Championships men's water polo tournament records and statistics
 List of World Aquatics Championships women's water polo tournament records and statistics
 List of World Aquatics Championships medalists in water polo
 List of Olympic champions in men's water polo
 List of Olympic champions in women's water polo

Notes

References

Sources

ISHOF

External links
 Official website of the FINA

Men
Champions, Men
Water polo